The 2015–16 NIFL Championship (known as the Belfast Telegraph Championship for sponsorship reasons) was the eighth and final season of the competition in this format since its establishment after a major overhaul of the league system in Northern Ireland, and the third season of the league as part of the Northern Ireland Football League (NIFL), which took over from the Irish Football Association (IFA) for the 2013–14 season onwards. The season began on 8 August 2015, and concluded on 30 April 2016.

Changes from 2014–15

Competition changes
League restructure proposals to be introduced over a three-season period were approved by the NIFL on 25 June 2014. The second phase, coming into effect this season, amended the Championship rules:
 Club development – a Club Development/Support programme will be developed and implemented to assist clubs to develop their club infrastructure and comply with licensing requirements.
 Championship 2 – following the relegation of Ballymoney United to regional football the previous season, Championship 2 will reduce in size to 14 clubs this season, before reducing further to 12 clubs next season.
 Promotion/relegation play-off – for the second consecutive season, the highest ranked club with a Championship licence, finishing in positions 2–6 in Championship 1 will participate in a promotion/relegation play-off for a place in the Premiership.
 Promotion and relegation – the three lowest ranked clubs (12th, 13th, 14th) will be relegated from Championship 1 and there will be a play-off between the club finishing in 11th position in Championship 1 and the runners-up in Championship 2. There will be no play-off if the club in Championship 2 has not received a licence for senior football. The five lowest ranked clubs (10th to 14th) will also be relegated from Championship 2 to regional football. However, if there is no eligible regional champion for promotion, only four clubs will be relegated with the 10th-placed club reprieved.

Team changes
Carrick Rangers won the previous season's Championship 1 title, winning promotion back to the top flight for the first time since their relegation in the 2011–12 season. In the bottom two, Dundela and PSNI were relegated to this season's Championship 2, while Lurgan Celtic and Annagh United went in the opposite direction after finishing first and second in Championship 2. For the second successive season, a club was relegated to regional football. Ballymoney United finished bottom of Championship 2 and were relegated to a regional division for the following season. As a result, Championship 2 reduced in size to 14 clubs.

Promoted from Championship 1 to the Premiership
 Carrick Rangers (1st in NIFL Championship 1)

Relegated from the Premiership to Championship 1
 Institute (12th in NIFL Premiership)

Promoted from Championship 2 to Championship 1
 Lurgan Celtic (1st in Championship 2)
 Annagh United (2nd in Championship 2)

Relegated from Championship 1 to Championship 2
 PSNI (13th in Championship 1)
 Dundela (14th in Championship 1)

Relegated from Championship 2 to Level 4 Regional League
 Ballymoney United (15th in Championship 2)

Championship 1

Stadia and locations

League table

Results
Each team will play every other team twice (once at home, and once away) for a total of 26 games.

Championship 2

Stadia and locations

League table

Results
Each team will play every other team twice (once at home, and once away) for a total of 26 games.

References

2015-16
North
2